Breon Borders (born July 22, 1995) is an American football cornerback who is a free agent. He played college football at Duke.

Early life and high school
Borders grew up in Statesville, North Carolina. During his senior year of high school, he was first-team all state as a football cornerback. In basketball, he was the county player of the year, leading his team to an overtime loss in the state championship game in which scored 26 points and gathered 9 rebounds. In track, Borders was the state champion in the 300 meter hurdles.

College career
In his four years at Duke, Borders played in 49 games, with 35 starts. In his first year, he set Duke's all-time record for interceptions as a freshman. For his Duke career, Borders graduated with the school's 6th highest number of career interceptions, 2nd highest number of pass break ups, and 3rd highest number of passes successfully defended.

After his senior year, Borders was selected to the 2016 All-ACC third-team.

Overall, Borders recorded 148 total tackles, one sack, 12 interceptions, 34 pass deflections, and two forced fumbles in his 49 games.

Professional career

Oakland Raiders
Borders signed with the Oakland Raiders as an undrafted free agent on May 5, 2017. He was waived on September 2, 2017, and was signed to the Raiders' practice squad the next day.

Buffalo Bills
On December 16, 2017, Borders was signed by the Buffalo Bills off the Raiders' practice squad.

On September 1, 2018, Borders was waived by the Bills.

Houston Texans
On September 12, 2018, Borders was signed to the Houston Texans practice squad. He was released on October 2, 2018.

Jacksonville Jaguars
On October 25, 2018, Borders was signed to the Jacksonville Jaguars practice squad. He was promoted to the active roster on December 22, 2018.

On December 3, 2019, Borders was waived by the Jaguars and re-signed to the practice squad.

Washington Redskins
On December 24, 2019, Borders was signed by the Washington Redskins off the Jaguars practice squad. He was released on March 23, 2020.

Pittsburgh Steelers
Borders signed with the Pittsburgh Steelers on April 16, 2020. He was waived on August 11, 2020.

Miami Dolphins 
Borders was claimed off waivers by the Miami Dolphins on August 12, 2020. He was waived on September 5, 2020.

Tennessee Titans
On September 21, 2020, Borders was signed to the Tennessee Titans' practice squad. He was placed on the practice squad/COVID-19 list by the team on October 8, and activated back to the practice squad on October 20. He was elevated to the active roster on October 31 for the team's week 8 game against the Cincinnati Bengals, and reverted to the practice squad after the game. He was signed to the active roster on November 7. In Week 12 against the Indianapolis Colts, Borders recorded his first career interception off a pass thrown by Philip Rivers during the 45–26 win. He was placed on injured reserve on December 12, 2020. He was waived by the Titans on February 25, 2021, but re-signed on March 1, 2021.

Borders played in nine games in 2021 before being released on November 9, 2021, but was re-signed to the practice squad.

Arizona Cardinals
On December 15, 2021, Borders was signed by the Arizona Cardinals off the Titans practice squad. He was waived on January 16, 2022. He signed a reserve/future contract with the Cardinals on January 19, 2022. He was released on August 14, 2022.

Chicago Bears
On November 22, 2022, Borders was signed to the Chicago Bears practice squad. He was promoted to the active roster on December 23.

References

External links
Jacksonville Jaguars bio
Duke Blue Devils bio

Living people
1995 births
Duke Blue Devils football players
Oakland Raiders players
People from Statesville, North Carolina
Players of American football from North Carolina
Buffalo Bills players
Houston Texans players
Jacksonville Jaguars players
Washington Redskins players
Pittsburgh Steelers players
Miami Dolphins players
Tennessee Titans players
Arizona Cardinals players
Chicago Bears players